Sanae Motokawa (本川紗奈生, Motokawa Sanae, born April 2, 1992) is a Japanese basketball player. She represented Japan in the women's tournament at the 2016 Summer Olympics.

References

1992 births
Living people
Japanese women's basketball players
Basketball players at the 2016 Summer Olympics
Olympic basketball players of Japan
Basketball players at the 2014 Asian Games
Asian Games medalists in basketball
Asian Games bronze medalists for Japan
Forwards (basketball)
Medalists at the 2014 Asian Games